Käru Parish was an Estonian municipality located in Rapla County. It had a population of 676 (as of 2009) and an area of 214.91 km2 (82.98 mi2).

Settlements
Small borough
Käru

Villages
Jõeküla - Kädva - Kändliku - Kõdu - Kullimaa - Lauri - Lungu - Sonni

References

External links